Loudon is a city in and the county seat of Loudon County, Tennessee, United States.  Its population was 6,001 at the 2020 census. It is included in the Knoxville, Tennessee Metropolitan Statistical Area.  The city is located in East Tennessee, southwest of Knoxville, on the Tennessee River.  Fort Loudoun, the colonial era fort for which the city was named, is located several miles to the south in Monroe County.

Geography
Loudon is located at  (35.733856, -84.349417).

Demographics

2020 census

As of the 2020 United States census, there were 6,001 people, 2,129 households, and 1,337 families residing in the city.

2010 census
As of the census of 2010, there were 5,381 people, 1,910 households. The population density was 389.4 people per square mile (185.4/km2). There were 2,426 housing units. The racial makeup of the city was 83% White, 3% African American, 0.31% Native American, 0.2% Asian, 11% from other races, and 2% from two or more races. Hispanic or Latino of any race were 16.1% of the population.

There were 1,910 households, out of which 23.6% had children under the age of 18 living with them, 49.0% were married couples living together, 12.3% had a female householder with no husband present, and 35.3% were non-families. 31.3% of all households were made up of individuals, and 16.3% had someone living alone who was 65 years of age or older. The average household size was 2.29 and the average family size was 2.85.

In the city the population was spread out, with 21.3% under the age of 18, 7.6% from 18 to 24, 26.3% from 25 to 44, 22.6% from 45 to 64, and 22.3% who were 65 years of age or older. The median age was 42 years. For every 100 females, there were 84.8 males. For every 100 females age 18 and over, there were 80.6 males.

The median income for a household in the city was $31,225, and the median income for a family was $39,410. Males had a median income of $31,229 versus $20,611 for females. The per capita income for the city was $18,281. About 10.7% of families and 17.1% of the population were below the poverty line, including 24.4% of those under age 18 and 15.3% of those age 65 or over.

Climate
The climate in this area is characterized by relatively high temperatures and evenly distributed precipitation throughout the year. According to the Köppen Climate Classification system, Loudon has a Humid subtropical climate, abbreviated "Cafe" on climate maps.

See also
 Blair's Ferry Storehouse

References

External links

Official site
City charter

Cities in Loudon County, Tennessee
Cities in Tennessee
County seats in Tennessee
Knoxville metropolitan area
Tennessee populated places on the Tennessee River